The 2010 BMW PGA Championship was the 56th edition of the BMW PGA Championship, an annual professional golf tournament on the European Tour. It was held 20–23 May at the West Course of Wentworth Club in Virginia Water, Surrey, England, a suburb southwest of London.

Englishman Simon Khan won his first BMW PGA Championship with a one stroke victory over Swede Fredrik Andersson Hed and fellow Englishman Luke Donald.

Course layout

Past champions in the field 
Seven former champions entered the tournament.

Made the cut

Missed the cut

Nationalities in the field

Round summaries

First round 
Thursday, 20 May 2010

Second round 
Friday, 21 May 2010

Third round 
Saturday, 22 May 2010

Final round 
Sunday, 23 May 2010

References 

BMW PGA Championship
Golf tournaments in England
BMW PGA Championship
BMW PGA Championship
BMW PGA Championship